List of Byzantine monuments in Istanbul (historic Constantinople). This list is not complete.

(By alphabetical order)

A
 Atik Mustafa Pasha Mosque
B
 Basilica Cistern
 Boukoleon Palace
C
 Chora Church
 Church of St. Mary of Blachernae (Istanbul)
 Church of St. Mary of the Mongols
 Church of St. Polyeuctus
 Cistern of Philoxenos
D
E
 Eski Imaret Mosque
F
 Fenari Isa Mosque
G
 Gül Mosque
H
 Hagia Irene
 Hagia Sophia
 Hippodrome of Constantinople
 Hirami Ahmet Pasha Mosque
K
 Kalenderhane Mosque
 Kefeli Mosque
 Koca Mustafa Pasha Mosque
L
 Little Hagia Sophia
M
N
P
 Pammakaristos Church
S
T
 Theodosius Cistern
V
 Vefa Kilise Mosque
Y
 Yoros Castle
Z
 Zeyrek Mosque
Ş
 Şeyh Süleyman Mosque

Monuments
Monuments, Byzantine
Monuments
Byzantine monuments